La Barranca de San Jerónimo, also known simply as La Barranca, is a cliff situated 1 mile northwest of the town of San Jerónimo, Jalisco, Mexico. Although the town adjacent to the cliff is located in the municipality of San Martín de Hidalgo, the Barranca lies within the neighboring municipality of Ameca.

External links
Information on the Barranca

Landforms of Jalisco
Landforms of Mexico
Cliffs of North America